A by-thirds Hyndburn Borough Council local election took place on 5 May 2016. Approximately one third of the local council's 35 seats fell up for election on that day. The following year (one year out of four, next due in 2017) sees Lancashire County Council elections for all residents of this borough.

Background
Before the election Labour had a majority of 25 councillors, Conservatives had 8 councillors, while UKIP had 2 councillors.

Labour candidates contested every ward, Conservative candidates contested every ward except Peel-ward, UKIP Candidates contested eight wards (not including their two-uncontested-seats, already won in 2014) and Greens only had two candidates in Altham-ward and Overton-ward.

Local Election result
The majority grouping of councillors was as the headline result of the election, was that Labour's majority was reinforced by one, with Conservatives having lost one of their seats to Labour, Ukip failed to gain any additional seats:

After the election, the composition of the council was -

Labour 26
Conservative 7
UKIP 2

The four (out of 16) Hyndburn Local Borough Council ward seats that were not up for re election in 2016 include the following wards, Clayton Le Moors, Huncoat, Immanuel in Oswaldtwistle and Milnshaw in Accrington.

The Church Ward seat, formerly held by Labour Councillor Joan Smith since 2012, and following her resignation in October 2015, was left vacated without a by election called.

Previous Councillors who were Standing-Down in this election included - Chris Fisher (Lab) (Altham), Joan Smith (Lab) (Church), Kerry Molineux (Lab) (Overton), Wendy Dwyer (Lab) (Peel), Harry Grayson (Lab) (Rishton), Bill Pinder (Lab) (St. Andrews).

Ward by ward

Altham

Barnfield

Baxenden

Central

Church

Netherton

Overton

Peel

Rishton

Spring Hill

St. Andrew's

St. Oswald's

References

2016 English local elections
2016
2010s in Lancashire